is a Japanese professional drifting driver, currently competing in the D1 Grand Prix series for Team DRoo-P and Yamasa.

Even before he started drifting professionally he always used the Toyota AE86. He first competed in the D1 Grand Prix in the first round of 2002 and has always scored points in every season. He got his first victory in Round 4 of the 2005 season at Autopolis. His Toyota Sprinter Trueno (later switching to Hideo Hiraoka's Corolla Levin AE85 which was converted to an AE86 and a Sprinter Trueno) was normally aspirated and uses nitrous oxide, which led to many collisions. In 2007 he had an average season being best of the AE86 drivers, finishing in 8th place overall. In 2008 he switched from his AE86 to a Lexus SC430, prepared by the renowned tuning garage Tom's.

Complete Drifting Results

D1 Grand Prix

External links
D1 Grand Prix
Team DRoo-P
Yamasa

Japanese racing drivers
Drifting drivers
1976 births
Living people
D1 Grand Prix drivers
Formula D drivers